Daniela Trandžíková-Nováková (born 26 October 1956) is a Slovak handball player. She competed at the 1980 Summer Olympics and the 1988 Summer Olympics.

References

1956 births
Living people
Slovak female handball players
Olympic handball players of Czechoslovakia
Handball players at the 1980 Summer Olympics
Handball players at the 1988 Summer Olympics
Sportspeople from Trenčín